Narromine Airport  is a small airport in Narromine, New South Wales, Australia. There are significant gliding operations at the airport. Flying at Narromine started as early as 1919.

See also
List of airports in New South Wales

References

External links

Narromine Aviation Museum – website of local museum

Airports in New South Wales